Menees is a surname. Notable people with the surname include:

Eric Menees, American Anglican priest
Thomas Menees (1823–1905), Confederate politician and academic